Mario De Micheli (born 3 February 1906 in Rome) was an Italian professional footballer who played as a defender.

He played for 3 seasons in the Italian Serie A with A.S. Roma between 1927–1932, collecting 75 appearances (70 in league play), but scored no goals for the club. He previously also played for Fortitudo between 1924–1927, collecting 19 league appearances and scoring one goal. In 2018, De Micheli was inducted into the A.S. Roma Hall of Fame.

Honours
Roma
Coppa CONI: 1927–28

Individual
A.S. Roma Hall of Fame: 2018

References 

1906 births
Year of death missing
Italian footballers
Serie A players
A.S. Roma players
Association football defenders